Sebastian Strandvall is a Finnish professional football midfielder who currently plays for Finnish side Vaasan Palloseura. He has also played one time for the national team of Finland. Besides Finland, he has played in Iran and Austria.

His brother Matias Strandvall is a cross-country skier at World Cup level.

Honours

Individual
Veikkausliiga Team of the Year: 2018

References
Guardian Football

1986 births
Living people
Finnish footballers
Swedish-speaking Finns
Veikkausliiga players
2. Liga (Austria) players
Persian Gulf Pro League players
IFK Mariehamn players
FC Haka players
Vaasan Palloseura players
SC Austria Lustenau players
Finnish expatriate footballers
Expatriate footballers in Austria
Expatriate footballers in Iran
Association football midfielders
Finland international footballers
Finland B international footballers
Sportspeople from Vaasa